There are two species of bird named smoky honeyeater.
 Common smoky honeyeater, Melipotes fumigatus
 Wattled smoky honeyeater, Melipotes carolae

Birds by common name